In West Bengal, Tripura, Odisha, Assam and Bangladesh, fried fish or māchh bhājā is a common delicacy eaten as a snack or fritter to go with a meal. The oil used to fry the fish may often be used as a dip. Fried fish roe (e.g. of hilsa) are also often eaten this way. The fish is often deep fried such that fish bones become crispy and edible, as is the case with small fish like Maurala (Opio cephalus).

Karimeen fish fry is also popular in Kerala, India.

Bangladeshi fish dishes
Bengali cuisine
National dishes
Odia cuisine